is a Japanese actor. He participated in Gekidan Kenko (now Nylon 100℃) from 1985 to 1992.

Since his debut Oohori expanded his career in the stage, television, and cinema. He was part of Unit Hanakusons. Oohori also appear in stage shows with folk singer Shozo.

Filmography

Stage

Films

TV series

Japanese male actors
1963 births
Living people
Actors from Miyagi Prefecture